
Branston may refer to:

Places in England
 Branston, Leicestershire
 Branston, Lincolnshire
 Branston, Staffordshire

People with the surname
 Frank Branston
 Guy Branston
 Jimmy Branston

Other uses
 Branston (brand), a brand of savoury food in the UK

See also
 Branson (disambiguation)